Brigadier Eric FitzGerald Dillon, 19th Viscount Dillon,  CMG, DSO (1881–1946) was an Irish peer and British Army officer who served in World War I.

He was educated at Rugby School and won the DSO, Legion of Honour, CMG, Croix de Guerre, Belgian Croix de Guerre and Order of Leopold of Belgian. He was a member of the Travellers' Club and lived at 5 Embankment Gardens Chelsea, London SW3. He and his wife, Nora Juanita Muriel (née Beckett), had two children. Their son, Michael Eric Dillon, succeeded his father as the 20th Viscount Dillon. Their daughter, Pamela Dillon, married William Onslow, 6th Earl of Onslow.

References

External links

Royal Munster Fusiliers officers
British Army personnel of World War I
1946 deaths
1881 births
Place of birth missing
Place of death missing

Companions of the Distinguished Service Order
Companions of the Order of St Michael and St George
Earls in the Jacobite peerage
Eric
British Army brigadiers